Clystea fulvicauda is a moth of the subfamily Arctiinae. It was described by Arthur Gardiner Butler in 1896. It is found in São Paulo, Brazil.

References

Clystea
Moths described in 1896